Acton is an unincorporated census-designated place in Los Angeles County, California, near the Antelope Valley. According to the 2010 census, Acton had a population of 7,596.

Acton is a small residential community located between the Sierra Pelona Mountains and the San Gabriel Mountains. It is off the Antelope Valley Freeway (Highway 14) south of Palmdale. The town has a rural western theme which can be seen in its homes, commercial buildings and historical buildings, some of which date back to the late 1800s. The homes in the mountains around Acton have views of the valley below. In the valley are ranch style homes, often with equestrian facilities. While Acton is not a part of the Antelope Valley, it is grouped together with the Valley in the General Plan. Acton has a Metrolink commuter rail station on its border with Palmdale that is themed in an "old western" style and has been seen in various movies and commercials.

History 
Acton was founded in 1887 by gold miners who were working in the Red Rover Mine. It was named after Acton, Massachusetts by one of the miners. Two of the best-known gold mines located in Acton were the Red Rover mine and the Governor mine. Mining of gold, copper, and titanium ore continued into the early 1900s. The town originally had served as a railroad camp from 1873 to 1876 when the Saugus-Mojave section of the Southern Pacific Railroad was under construction.

Acton was once considered for the State capital of California. California Governor Henry T. Gage (1899–1903) owned the Governor Mine, hence the name, and sought to relocate the capital to Acton. This effort ultimately failed and the capital was not moved from Sacramento. In the late 1880s, Acton started to become more of a ranching and farming community. In 1889 Acton's first hotel and its first saloon, the "49er", was opened and is still in business today.

Geography

Climate
This region experiences warm (but not very hot) and dry summers, with no average monthly temperatures above 71.6 °F. According to the Köppen Climate Classification system, Acton has a warm-summer Mediterranean climate, abbreviated "Csb" on climate maps.
Summer month days average 88 °F and above.

Demographics

The 2010 United States Census reported that Acton had a population of 7,596. The racial makeup of Acton was 6,564 (86.4%) White (76.1% Non-Hispanic White), 57 (0.8%) African American, 70 (0.9%) Native American, 155 (2.0%) Asian, 5 (0.1%) Pacific Islander, 451 (5.9%) from other races, and 294 (3.9%) from two or more races. Hispanic or Latino of any race were 1,373 persons (18.1%).

The Census reported that 7,596 people (100% of the population) lived in households, 0 (0%) lived in non-institutionalized group quarters, and 0 (0%) were institutionalized.

There were 2,660 households, out of which 901 (33.9%) had children under the age of 18 living in them, 1,771 (66.6%) were opposite-sex married couples living together, 194 (7.3%) had a female householder with no husband present, 116 (4.4%) had a male householder with no wife present.  There were 108 (4.1%) unmarried opposite-sex partnerships, and 30 (1.1%) same-sex married couples or partnerships. 436 households (16.4%) were made up of individuals, and 143 (5.4%) had someone living alone who was 65 years of age or older. The average household size was 2.86.  There were 2,081 families (78.2% of all households); the average family size was 3.21.

The population was spread out, with 1,672 people (22.0%) under the age of 18, 660 people (8.7%) aged 18 to 24, 1,394 people (18.4%) aged 25 to 44, 3,037 people (40.0%) aged 45 to 64, and 833 people (11.0%) who were 65 years of age or older.  The median age was 45.5 years. For every 100 females, there were 100.0 males.  For every 100 females age 18 and over, there were 97.7 males.

The homeowner vacancy rate was 1.7%; the rental vacancy rate was 7.4%.  6,852 people (90.2% of the population) lived in owner-occupied housing units and 744 people (9.8%) lived in rental housing units.

Economy
Median earnings per worker in Acton in 2015 were $75,714 compared to the United States average of $44,178. Acton has $84,375 median earnings for men, 55% greater than the $54,384 median for women. 22% of the people in Acton report self-employment income, twice the U.S. average of 11%.

6.9% of the population of Acton lives in poverty. Of those, 17% are employed. Just 1% of Acton households use some form of public assistance, compared to the United States average of 14%.

7% of Acton workers carpool to work, less than the U.S. average of 10%. Acton has a large number of people who are able to work from home at 12% versus 4% for the U.S. The average commute to work in Acton is 46 minutes, much longer than the U.S. average of 26 minutes.

Parks and recreation

Farm Sanctuary
Farm Sanctuary, founded here in 1986, was America's first shelter for farmed animals.

Shambala Preserve
The Shambala Preserve, a wild animal nature park run by actress Tippi Hedren, is located near Acton. Ventures on Hedren's  wild animal compound include a Safari at the authentic African-style haven for more than 70 African lions, Royal Bengal and Siberian tigers, spotted and black leopards, cougars, and African elephants.

Parker Mountain

Government

Acton is part of the unincorporated portion of Los Angeles County and is in the 5th Supervisorial District. At the local level, the community is represented by the Acton Town Council, an advisory group of citizens made up of 7 members.

Education

Acton is within the Acton-Agua Dulce Unified School District. There are three schools in Acton: Meadowlark Elementary School,  High Desert Middle School,  and Vasquez High School.

Infrastructure
The Los Angeles County Department of Health Services operates the Antelope Valley Health Center in Lancaster, serving Acton.

Filming location 

Movies: Acton was one of the filming locations for Steven Spielberg's TV movie Duel, and the Clint Eastwood movie Blood Work. Terminator 3: Rise of the Machines was partially filmed at the local AM-PM Gas Station, located on the south side of Highway 14. Acton is also where Little Miss Sunshine was filmed along highway 14 near Red Rover Mine Road.  Large parts of the movie Wind Talkers were also shot in Acton. Some of the underwater scenes of the Titanic sinking were filmed in a specially constructed pool on a mesa by Mill Creek and Soledad Canyon Road on the Pölsa Rosa Movie Ranch.  Army of Darkness was filmed near Acton. 

TV Series: Multiple shows such as Malcolm in the Middle, Sons of Anarchy, Reno 911, and Falling Skies have filmed various episodes off Crown Valley Rd.

Music Videos: Tom Petty and the Heartbreakers' "Swingin" music video was filmed along Escondido Canyon Road. Metallica filmed the music video for the song "The Day That Never Comes" in Acton.  Taylor Swift filmed parts of her music video for "I Knew You Were Trouble" in Acton.  Chet Faker filmed the "Gold" skate video on a road near Acton.

References

External links
Acton information website

Census-designated places in California
Census-designated places in Los Angeles County, California
Populated places in the Mojave Desert
Populated places established in 1887